Acanthoxylini is a tribe of Phasmatodeas (stick insects and relatives). They belong to the "typical" stick insects of the superfamily Anareolatae, though they are rather notable among these. For example, the New Zealand giant stick insect (the only species of Argosarchus) is huge, and all Acanthoxyla are females reproducing by parthenogenesis.

Genera
The following genera are currently recognized:
 Acanthoxyla Uvarov, 1944
 Argosarchus Hutton
 Clitarchus Stål, 1875
 Pseudoclitarchus Salmon, 1991
 Tepakiphasma Buckley and Bradler, 2010

See also
 List of stick insects of New Zealand

References

External links
 The Phasmid Study Group: Acanthoxylini

Phasmatodea
Phasmatodea tribes